An octagonal church has an octagonal (eight-sided polygon) architectural plan. The exterior and the interior (the nave) may be shaped as eight-sided polygon with approximately equal sides or only the nave is eight-sided supplemented by choir and porch (or narthex) attached to the octagon. This architectural plan is found in some 70 churches in Norway. Among these Hospitalskirken in Trondheim is the oldest. This type of church plan spread from the Diocese of Nidaros to other parts of Norway. Virtually all octagonal churches in Norway are constructed as log buildings mostly covered by clapboards. Some of the largest churches in Norway are octagonal and the list includes important cultural heritage monuments such as Trinity Church (Oslo), Sør-Fron Church, and Røros Church.

History

During the Middle Ages, some 1000 wooden stave churches and only 270 stone churches were erected in Norway. During the 15th and 16th centuries, virtually no new churches were built. When church building resumed around the year 1600, most stave churches disappeared and were often replaced by log churches. While in most of Europe, only masonry churches were built, wood construction still dominated in Norway. During the 1600s, the cruciform floor plan tended to replace the traditional simple rectangular "long church". In the cruciform church, the view to the altar is partly obstructed by walls, a drawback that is not found in the octagonal shape. The octagonal shape also allows the pulpit to be the focal point, according to the ideals of the Reformation where the spoken word (the sermon) should be the central act during a worship service. Lorentz Dietrichson believed that the octagonal church became popular because of the rationalism's need for the church as a lecture hall ("auditorium").

In 1686, the first octagonal church in Norway, Vrådal Church, was constructed in Vrådal (in Telemark). It was a log building that replaced a medieval stave church. The Vrådal church apparently did not influence subsequent octagonal buildings in Norway. Inspiration for the first octagonal churches in Trøndelag probably came from elsewhere in Protestant Europe. Some octagonal churches within Lutheranism were erected at the same time in Sweden and Germany for instance Zum Friedefürsten Church in Saxony and Järlåsa Church in Sweden. In the Netherlands, the reformed church in Willemstad, North Brabant, Koepelkerk (Domed Church) (1607), the first Protestant church building in the Netherlands, was given an octagonal shape according to Calvinism's focus on the sermon. The Oostkerk, Middelburg is a domed, octagonal church erected from 1648 to 1667. Johan Christopher Hempel, architect and master builder of Hospitalskirken in Trondheim, was probably from the Netherlands where the octagonally shaped church first appeared and spread to other Protestant countries in Northern Europe. The octagonal floor plan came to Denmark when Frederiksberg Church was built by Dutch Felix Dusart. Dusart used a church in his Dutch hometown as a model. Frederiksberg Church is in turn regarded as the model for the octagonal baroque church (1756) in Rellingen, Schleswig-Holstein. The Rellingen Church, a key baroque monument in Schleswig-Holstein, is shown on the town's coat of arms. The baroque Katharinenkirche in Großenaspe, Schleswig-Holstein, is an octagonal design with "pulpit altar" (″Kanzelaltar″ in German) used for instance in Sør-Fron Church. During the 18th century, both Schleswig-Holstein and Norway were a part of the Kingdom of Denmark-Norway. Hosar suggests that Norwegian troops did military service in Schleswig-Holstein, and may have observed the new churches being constructed there at the time.

The octagonal shape provides a more rigid log structure than the simple rectangular long church design, allowing a larger nave to be built. Christie believes that this is why the octagonal design was adopted alongside the cruciform plan. Starting in 1810, ten octagonal churches were erected in the rural interior parts of Agder, most of these constructions used Hornnes Church as model.

Construction

Virtually all octagonal churches in Norway are built from timber in a log construction, notable exceptions are Sør-Fron Church, Vang Church at Ridabu in Hamar and Røros Church (stone buildings). Trinity Church (Oslo) is the only octagonal church in Norway built in red brick. These masonry buildings are also the largest among the octagonal churches. The octagonal plan creates different angles and accordingly more challenging work for the carpenter compared to buildings with straight angels such as the cruciform plan. The cruciform plan was the dominant church design in Norway when the octagonal plan was introduced. The octagonal plan offers better view of the choir compared to the cruciform plan. The octagonal plan also creates a more rigid wood construction then the simple rectangular plan ("long church" or "hall church") allowing taller and wider buildings with a single room. Håkon Christie believed that these are the reasons the octagonal church became popular in Norway. In the basilica-shaped Samnanger church, the corners of the aisles  are cut creating an octagonal plan. This design was chosen to make the walls shorter and avoiding the need to splice logs.

Architects
Until the 19th century, Norwegian churches were often designed and constructed by master builders rather than by professionally trained architects. Johan Christopher Hempel, chief mason and builder of Trondheim, designed the two oldest existing octagonal churches. Master builder and politician Elling Olsson Walbøe designed and constructed at least three octagonal churches. Parish priests were also involved, at least three octagonal churches were designed by their respective pastors (Ulstein Church, Old Stordal Church, and Vang Church). For instance, Abraham Pihl designed the large Vang Church in Ridabu. A large number of churches, including several octagonal, were constructed according to prototypes compiled by Hans Linstow.

The prominent architect Christian H. Grosch were responsible for a number of churches in Norway, including the basic plan for several octagonal churches, including
Mo Church (Nord-Odal)
Tjugum Church in Balestrand
Otterøy Church in Namsos
Rogne Church i Øystre Slidre
Dverberg Church in Andøy
Tangen Church in Stange
 Previous Kirkenes Church, lost during the World War II

Farmer and "founding father" Lars Larsen Forsæth produced drawings used to build at least three octagonal churches:
 Klæbu Church
 Støren Church
 Hornnes Church

Distribution

During the period from 1750 to 1830, about 230 churches were constructed in Norway. Among these, 35 were octagonal, 62 were long churches (single nave hall church) and 110 were given a cruciform floor plan. During this period, 17 octagonal churches appeared in the Diocese of Nidaros (all Norway north of Dovre). Later, these church designs became popular in the rural Agder.

Muri in 1975 made a survey of existing churches built since Christianity was introduced in Norway until World War II:

In addition to the existing churches listed, some octagonal churches were demolished and replaced. Previous octagonal churches (year built-year dismantled), included in statistics:
 Vrådal Church in Kviteseid (1686-1887)
 Øye Church in Surnadal (1724-1871)
 Undrumsdal Church in Re (1730-1882)
 Hopen Church at Smøla (1749-1891)
 Flekkefjord Church (1790-1843), a new octagonal church was built in 1833
 Hareid Church (1806-1877), built by Elling Olsson Walbøe, used as a model for Haram Church

Some of the largest churches in Norway are octagonal:
Røros Church 1640 seats
Trinity Church (Oslo) 1000 seats (originally 1200), Greek cross and octagon combined
Vang Church 1000 seats
Sør-Fron Church 750 seats
Tynset Church 700 seats (the largest log church)
Flekkefjord Church 650 seats
Stor-Elvdal Church 600 seats
Dolstad Church 500 seats

List of octagonal churches

Picture gallery

References

 
Church architecture
Types of church buildings